"Losing My Mind" is a song by American rock band Falling in Reverse. It was released on February 22, 2018. In the US, the song was ranked at number 50 on the Billboard Hot Rock Songs chart. The song has more than 16 million views on Spotify.

Promotion and release
The song was released in February 2018 almost a year after the release of their fourth studio album Coming Home. The band had no intention of recording an album, vocalist Ronnie Radke later announced in an interview with Forbes that "Losing My Mind" is the first song in its era to only release singles or perhaps an EP. Although it was not released for any album, the song was included on the Drugs EP, released only on Spotify.

Composition and lyric
The song was written by vocalist Ronnie Radke, Cody Stewart and Tyler Smyth, and composed by Falling in Reverse. The song marks the return of the rap rock sound to the band, whose sound they had left in 2014 due to poor reviews for their second studio album Fashionably Late released in 2013. Radke spoke about the song in a statement:

In this song Ronnie shows us a letter about how he was able to overcome his past problems such as his mother's abandonment, the bullying he suffered and did in his childhood and his drug problems including his problems. Ronnie uses some code words like saying he's a NASDAQ, The lyrics explain how Ronnie can be a rock star and a rapper at the same time and that no critic or his own fans could stop him from making the music he wants.

Music video
The music video was directed by Ethan Lader who had already worked with the band on the videos "Superhero" and "Fuck You And All Your Friends". The music video is the start of a story for future music videos showing vocalist Ronnie Radke wrestling with his other self. Some said that the music video has futuristic effects including on the music.

In February 2021 the music video has 20 million views on YouTube.

Charts

References

2018 songs
2018 singles
Falling in Reverse songs
Songs written by Ronnie Radke
Epitaph Records singles